Mordellistena laterimarginalis is a beetle in the genus Mordellistena of the family Mordellidae. It was described in 1965 by Ermisch.

References

laterimarginalis
Beetles described in 1965